Saurav Mandal (born 6 November 2000) is an Indian professional footballer who plays as a winger for Indian Super League club Kerala Blasters.

Club career

Early life and career 
Saurav was born in Jalandhar, Punjab on 6 November 2000. He began his youth career in the JCT Football Academy, from where he joined East Bengal's under-18 setup in 2018. He signed his first senior contract with Rainbow AC, whom he represented in the 2018–19 I-League 2nd Division season, and then signed for the ATK Reserves for the 2019–20 I-League 2nd Division season before leaving the latter to sign for Churchill Brothers in 2020.

Churchill Brothers 
In 2020, Saurav signed for the I-League side Churchill Brothers FC Goa ahead of the 2020–21 I-League season. Despite making it to the squad, Saurav failed to make any appearance for the club in his debut season. Saurav played his debut match for Churchill in the 2021–22 I-League season in the match against TRAU FC on 12 March 2022, where he came in as substitute for Asif Ali Molla in the 53rd minute but Churchill end up losing the game 2–0 at full-time. He scored his debut goal on 1 April 2022 against NEROCA FC, where he was a starter and scored the opening goal in the 8th minute of the game as Churchill won the match 2–4.

After playing 14 matches and scoring a single goal, Saurav left the club in 2022.

Kerala Blasters 
On 23 June 2022, the Indian Super League club Kerala Blasters FC announced that they have reached an agreement with Churchill Brothers FC Goa for the transfer of Saurav, with the transfer remaining subject to the medical. On 28 June 2022, the Blasters confirmed that they have signed Mandal on a three-year deal until 2025 for an undisclosed transfer fee. Saurav made his debut for the Blasters on 23 October 2022 in a 2–1 loss against Odisha FC by coming as a substitute in the 87th minute. On 5 November 2022, Sourav made his first start for the club in a 3–0 away win against NorthEast United FC, where provided the first assist for Dimitrios Diamantakos in the 56th minute.

Career statistics

Club

References

External links 
 
 Saurav Mandal at Goal
 
 Saurav Mandal at Flashscore
 
 

2000 births
Living people
Association football midfielders
Indian footballers
Footballers from Punjab, India
People from Jalandhar
I-League 2nd Division players
I-League players
Indian Super League players
Churchill Brothers FC Goa players
Kerala Blasters FC players